Fantastic Voyages Vol. 1 is a DVD released by the New Zealand band Fat Freddy's Drop. It includes live footage shot on their '2006 World Cup Tour' around Europe, as well as extra music videos and bonus material.

DVD track listing

True Stories
Fat Freddy's Drop live footage shot on the European '2006 World Cup Tour'. These versions of old and new tracks as live clips are one-offs, inspired jams. Jump on the tour bus, be a fly on the lid of the tequila bottle backstage and check what the Freddys get up to when they leave NZ without the Whanau. This is Rock & Roll after all...

Ireland - The Garden Party
Edinburgh - Liquid Rooms
Manchester - Academy 2
London - Brixton Academy
Berlin - Club Maria
Paris - Cabaret Sauvage
Barcelona - Sónar
Portugal - Algarve Summer Festival

Music Videos
Wandering Eye
Roady
Ray Ray

Kiss Da Cook
Episode 1 - Cockles Galicia - Shuk

Hidden Gems
Midnight Marauders - Algarve Summer Festival - Docket Bay - Dom Pedro Golf - Portugal

2007 video albums
Fat Freddy's Drop albums